The Tale of Custard the Dragon is a poem for children written by Ogden Nash. 
A picture book of the 1936 poem with illustrations by Lynn M. Munsinger was published in 1995.

The poem has been described as "probably his most famous poem for kids". In 1959, it inspired Leonard Lipton to write a poem that evolved into the song "Puff, the Magic Dragon". This poem is written as a ballad which presents a short story with parody.

Synopsis 

The poem opens with the introduction of Belinda and her company of pets: Ink (the kitten), Blink (the mouse), Mustard (the dog) and Custard (the cowardly dragon). Everyone in the house is very fond of bragging and boasting about their bravery, except for Custard. Despite his pretty frightening looks, the dragon cries for a nice safe cage and gets tickled mercilessly. His inmates take it for granted that he is a coward and makes him the butt of ridicule, also calling him Percival as he is weak and this poem includes a lot irony as the fierce looking dragon is weak and scared unlike story book dragons that are fierce and powerful.

All of a sudden, a pirate breaks into the house with pistols in his hands. Panic-stricken, everyone flees from the scene. However, the seemingly coward dragon chases at the pirate and devours him. Thus, he proves himself as the bravest of all and everyone feels obliged to him.

Now, as the danger is over, everyone again goes about blowing his own trumpet as before and Custard keeps asking for a nice safe cage.

References

1936 poems
American poems
Children's poems
1995 children's books
1995 poetry books
American picture books
American poetry books
Children's poetry books
Fictional dragons